The 2021 Lamborghini Super Trofeo Europe is the thirteenth season of the Lamborghini Super Trofeo Europe. The calendar consists of six rounds. Every event features two 50 Minute races. 2021 marks the third season of the Lamborghini Huracán Super Trofeo Evo. There can be two drivers or one driver per car. A car is entered in one of four categories: Pro, Pro-Am, Am and Lamborghini Cup (LC).

Calendar

Entry List
All teams use the Lamborghini Huracán Super Trofeo Evo.

Race Results
Bold indicates the overall winner.

See also			

 2021 GT World Challenge Europe Endurance Cup
 2021 GT World Challenge Europe Sprint Cup

References

External links			

 

Lamborghini Super Trofeo seasons
Lamborghini